Dictyophorus spumans, the koppie foam grasshopper or , is a species of grasshopper in the family Pyrgomorphidae indigenous to Africa. The name "foaming grasshopper" derives from the insect's ability to produce a toxic foam from its thoracic glands. It is closely related to Phymateus.

The neck shield has a warty surface, and their color is highly variable. It is toxic due to the poisons that it sequesters from its diet, which includes a large number of toxic and distasteful plants such as milkweed.

Races
 D. s. subsp. spumans – South Africa
 D. s. subsp. ater – northern South Africa and Zimbabwe
 D. s. subsp. pulchra – eastern South Africa and Mozambique
 D. s. subsp. servillei – widespread in Africa
 D. s. subsp. calceata – widespread in Africa

Gallery

References

Pyrgomorphidae
Orthoptera of Africa
Insects described in 1787